The LG Extravert is a basic phone made by LG Electronics and was carried by Verizon Wireless. It runs on the Brew MP mobile operating system. The phone is distinctive for having a sliding QWERTY keyboard. It was introduced around early 2012. It is a successor to the wildly successful LG Cosmos, specifically the Cosmos Touch.

There is a successor model, the LG Extravert 2, which has been discontinued.

References

Extravert
Verizon Wireless